Litoria viranula is a species of frog in the family Hylidae, endemic to New Guinea. It is in the same species group with Litoria bicolor.

The male adult frog measures about 23.5 mm in snout-vent length and the female about 26.4 mm. Its head is longer than it is wide and its pupils are horizontal. The front feet usually have almost no webbing and the hind feet have lots of webbing.  The skin of the dorsum is bright green and there is a bronze stripe on its back. It has darker patches on its legs and middle.

This frog lives in forests near the Digul River and Fly River. The female lays eggs in flowing water and in temporarily flooded environments.

The Latin name of this species viranula is a combination of viridis and ranula for green and frog.

Original description

References

Species described in 2008
viranula